Hepworth is a village and civil parish in the West Suffolk district of the English county of Suffolk. Nearby settlements include the villages of Stanton and Barningham. For transport there is the A143 road nearby. Hepworth has a place of worship. The population at the 2011 Census was 536.

St Peter's Church

St Peter's church dates from the 13th century. However following a fire in 1898 the church was substantially rebuilt by John Shewell Corder. It is a grade II* listed building.

Notable residents
Henry Hand
John Hayter
Charles Payne

References

Genuki
UK villages
About Britain

Villages in Suffolk
Civil parishes in Suffolk
Borough of St Edmundsbury